The 1800 Vermont gubernatorial election for Governor of Vermont took place throughout September, and resulted in the re-election of Isaac Tichenor to a one-year term.

The Vermont General Assembly met in Middlebury on October 9. The Vermont House of Representatives appointed a committee to examine the votes of the freemen of Vermont for governor, lieutenant governor, treasurer, and members of the governor's council.

The committee examined the votes, which showed that Isaac Tichenor was chosen for a fourth one-year term. In the election for lieutenant governor, the voters selected Paul Brigham for a fifth one-year term. No candidate for treasurer had a majority of the popular vote. In accordance with the Vermont Constitution, the General Assembly was required to make a choice. The Assembly met on October 10 and elected Benjamin Swan. Vote totals for the governor's race were reported as follows.

Results

References

Vermont gubernatorial elections
gubernatorial
Vermont